ZunZuneo was an online United States state owned company social networking and microblogging service marketed to Cuban users. The service was created in 2010 by the United States Agency for International Development (USAID). The US government covertly developed the service as a long-term strategy to encourage Cuban youths to revolt against the nation's government, fomenting a "Cuban Spring". The initiative also appears to have had a surveillance dimension, allowing "a vast database about Cuban ZunZuneo subscribers, including gender, age, 'receptiveness' and 'political tendencies to be built. The word "zunzuneo" is Cuban slang for a hummingbird's call.

Contractors funded by USAID "set up a byzantine system of front companies using a Cayman Islands bank account, and recruit[ed] unsuspecting executives who would not be told of the company's ties to the US government", according to an Associated Press (AP) report which traced the origin of the service. ZunZuneo, dubbed the "Cuban Twitter", reached at least 40,000 Cuban subscribers but was retired in 2012 without notice. According to the AP, the service was ended because of the expiration of the grant that funded the program. The developers aimed to use "non-controversial content", such as sport and music, to build up subscribers and to then introduce political messages to encourage dissent.

The AP released an exposé on ZunZuneo in April 2014. Following the report, the US government acknowledged that it funded the service but denied that it was a covert program. According to a USAID spokesperson, the program was reviewed by the Government Accountability Office in 2013, and found to have been executed in accordance with US law. The United States Senate Committee on Foreign Relations requested documents about the program from USAID.

In 2014, the US Office of Cuba Broadcasting announced that it was creating a successor, Piramideo. The platform is designed to spread anti-communist and pro-United States propaganda.

See also

 Cuba–United States relations
 Cuban Project

References

Cuba–United States relations
Defunct microblogging services
Internet in Cuba
Internet properties disestablished in 2012
Internet properties established in 2010
Obama administration controversies
United States Agency for International Development
United States government propaganda organizations
United States propaganda in Cuba